Cheirodendron trigynum, also known as Ōlapa or common cheirodendron, is a species of flowering plant in the ginseng family, Araliaceae, that is endemic to Hawaii.

References

External links

Araliaceae
Endemic flora of Hawaii
Trees of Hawaii
Flora without expected TNC conservation status